The 2017–18 EML season (also known as the Nordic Power Hokiliiga for sponsorship reasons) was the 78th season of the Meistriliiga, the top level of ice hockey in Estonia. The season began on 30 September 2017 and concluded on 24 March 2018, with HC Viking winning the Estonian Championship over Tartu Kalev-Välk in four games.

Teams

Regular season

League table

Playoffs

Bracket

References

External links
Official website

Estonia
2017 in Estonian sport
2018 in Estonian sport
Meistriliiga (ice hockey) seasons